Gator Bait II: Cajun Justice is a 1988 sequel to the 1974 film 'Gator Bait, written, produced and directed by Beverly Sebastian and Ferd Sebastian. Largely ignored upon release, the film received a second life on cable television and home video.

Plot
When a sweet city girl is initiated into the rugged ways of the Louisiana bayou by her good-natured Cajun husband "Big T", she ends up putting her newly acquired survival skills to good use when she is kidnapped by Big T's chief rival Leroy and his swarthy, brutish family as part of an ongoing feud.

Cast
 Melissa Alleman as Bridesmaid
 Jocelyn Boudreaux as Bridesmaid
 Rocky Dugas as Emile
 Keith Gros as Abert
 Reyn Hubbard as Geke
 Sid Larrwiere as Drunk
 Jan MacKenzie as Angelique
 Randolph Parro as Cajun Gentleman
 Susan Serigny as Cajun Cook
 Jerry Armstrong as Joe Boy
 Betty Flemming as Cajun Woman
 Levita Gros as Bartender
 Brad Koepenick as Luke
 Tray Loren as Big T.
 Paul Muzzcat as Leroy
 Ben Sebastian as Elick
 Peter Torrito as Bestman

References

External links
 

1988 films
1988 action thriller films
American action thriller films
American independent films
1980s English-language films
1988 independent films
Films directed by Beverly Sebastian
Films directed by Ferd Sebastian
1980s American films